Queenscliff may refer to:
 Queenscliff, New South Wales
 Queenscliff, Victoria